HMS Borer was a 14-gun  built by Tyson & Blake at Bursledon. She was launched in 1812 and sold off in 1815.

Design and construction
The Bold class were a revival of Sir William Rule's  design of 1804.  They were armed with ten 18-pounder carronades and two 6-pounder bow chasers. Built at Bursledon by Tyson & Blake, Borer was launched on 26 June 1812 and commissioned under Commander Richard Coote.

Service
In 1847 the Admiralty awarded the Naval General Service Medal with clasp "8 Apr Boat Service 1814" to all surviving claimants from the action. The raid was commanded by Coote, who was promoted as a result of the successful outcome, as was Lieutenant Pyne who assisted him.

Commander J Rawlins took over from Commander Coote in May 1814. The Borer was present with Vice Admiral Alexander Cochrane's fleet off the coast of New Orleans. Under the rules of prize-money, the Borer shared in the proceeds of the capture of the American vessels in the Battle of Lake Borgne on 14 December 1814. With peace declared, the Borer's last task was to pick up some Royal Marines and some escaped slaves from the British outpost at Prospect Bluff When the Borer stopped off in Bermuda, one of the people that the ship's captain spoke to did not approve of freeing slaves, and a minor diplomatic incident started when a "Gentleman of respectability at Bermuda" wrote an anonymous tip-off to the American authorities.  The Borer left Bermuda on 25 May, accompanied by the transport vessel Daedalus, and arrived at Halifax on 3 June. Thereafter the Borer arrived at Portsmouth on 10 July 1815.

Footnotes
Notes

Citations

External links
 Connecticut River Museum essay on the British Raid on Essex

References
 
 Foreign Office (1835). British and Foreign State Papers Volume 6, 1818–1819. Piccadilly, London: James Ridgway. 
 

 

Brigs of the Royal Navy
1812 ships
Ships built on the River Hamble
War of 1812 ships of the United Kingdom